Urocoras longispinus is a funnel weaver spider species found in  Central and Eastern Europe.

See also 
 List of Agelenidae species

References

External links 

Agelenidae
Spiders of Europe
Spiders described in 1897